Byres Castle was a castle located at Byres, in East Lothian, Scotland.

The castle was a stronghold of the Lindsay family, known as Lord Lindsay of the Byres. It was the caput of the Barony of Byres. No remains of the castle exist above ground. An old farm building is incorrectly known as the castle.

References
Coventry, Martin. Castles of the Clans: the strongholds and seats of 750 Scottish families and clans. Musselburgh, 2008. page 70.
CANMORE - Byres

Castles in East Lothian
Listed castles in Scotland
Clan Lindsay